S.N.P.J. is a borough in Lawrence County, Pennsylvania, United States. As of the 2020 Census, the borough had a population of 15. It is part of the New Castle micropolitan area.

S.N.P.J. stands for "Slovenska Narodna Podporna Jednota" (Slovene National Benefit Society), a fraternal society and financial co-operative based in North Fayette, Pennsylvania. The society applied to have their  recreation center in western Pennsylvania designated as a separate municipality in 1977. The S.N.P.J. borough was created so that the society could, among other things, get its own liquor license. North Beaver Township, the municipality in which the center was originally located, restricted the sale of alcohol on Sundays (blue law).

S.N.P.J. once had the distinction of being the least-populated borough in the state (but not municipality; East Fork Road District, population 14, was less populous) until a mine fire beneath Centralia made that borough unsafe to live in.

Geography 
S.N.P.J. is located at  (40.928916, -80.498828).

It is more of a recreation complex than a community, and has 60 rental cabins, 115 mobile home slots, and an artificial lake. It is open to the public as a summertime resort and facility for bingo, weddings, and dances.  Members of the society get a discount on the events.

Demographics

See also
Tavistock, New Jersey

References

External links 
S.N.P.J. Recreation Center
S.N.P.J. home page

Populated places established in 1978
Boroughs in Lawrence County, Pennsylvania
Slovene-American history